Dashkia Union is a union of Kalihati Upazila, Tangail District, Bangladesh. It is situated 22 km north of Tangail on the bank of the Bangshai River.

Demographics
According to Population Census 2011 performed by Bangladesh Bureau of Statistics, The total population of Dashkia union is 15100. There are  3667 households in total.

Education
The literacy rate of Dashkia Union is 46.2% (Male-51.1%, Female-41.5%).

See also
 Union Councils of Tangail District

References

Populated places in Dhaka Division
Populated places in Tangail District
Unions of Kalihati Upazila